Jens Toller Rosenheim (born 1636 in Christiania, died in 1690 in Dublin), was a Norwegian nobleman, jurist and official.

Family and marriage
Jens Toller was the son of Niels Toller (1592-1642), who was Mayor of Christiania (now Oslo) and one of the leading merchants in the city. His father had originally come from Haderslev. Upon his father's death, Jens and his brother Niels inherited a large fortune. Jens Toller attended the University of Copenhagen (1652) and the University of Leiden (1658). He married in 1666 Anne Hansdatter Lilienskiold (d. ca 1680), the daughter of Hans Hansen Lilienskiold (1610-1681) who was the Mayor of Bergen.

General history
Jens Toller became lawyer in 1666. He was in 1676 ennobled under the surname Rosenheim. In 1679, he became the judge of the Supreme Court. In 1676 he became a deputy in the Danish Chancellery. In 1677, he became a county governor in Lister and Mandal county, a post he held until 1681. He also temporarily served as a stewart (acting governor) in the Christianssand stiftamt, a diocesan county in the absence of Ove Juul, the Governor-general of Norway. He also served as the County Governor of Nedenæs county from 1680-1681. Rosenheim was a diplomat to England from 1687-1688. Around 1689, he went to Ireland as the Supreme Commissary of War for the Danish troops. The troops were later given to King Wilhelm III of Orange in order to fight the forces of the expelled king, James II. Rosenheim died during his commission in Ireland.

Coat of arms
Description: A shield of four fields, whereof the upper dexter and the lower sinister on white background have two crossing green rose stilks with red flower, and the others on yellow background have a black human head with a white headband. The same head is the crest.

See also
 Danish nobility
 Norwegian nobility
 Jens Toller Rosenheim article in the Norwegian Wikipedia

References

External links
 Rosenheim coat of arms

1636 births
1690 deaths
Lawyers from Oslo
University of Copenhagen alumni
Leiden University alumni
17th-century Danish nobility
Nobility from Oslo
17th-century Norwegian nobility
County governors of Norway
Judges from Oslo
17th-century lawyers